Daniel Joseph Garcia (born April 12, 1980) is a retired Major League Baseball second baseman who played for the New York Mets in  and .

In , with the New York Yankees Triple-A affiliate, the Columbus Clippers, Garcia hit .242, with 3 home runs, and 39 RBI. In , playing for the Somerset Patriots of the independent Atlantic League, Garcia hit .273 and stole 39 bases which led the league. Garcia currently resides in Florida with his family.

External links

Danny Garcia's MILB Biography

1980 births
Living people
Brooklyn Cyclones players
St. Lucie Mets players
New York Mets players
Baseball players from California
Major League Baseball second basemen
Norfolk Tides players
Buffalo Bisons (minor league) players
Pepperdine Waves baseball players
Columbus Clippers players
Somerset Patriots players